Get Up! is a CD released by heavy metal band Helix in 2006.  It was Helix' first official EP, and their 18th official release.  It was released independently by Brian Vollmer's Dirty Dog Records.  All 7 tracks would be re-released internationally on the 2007 full-length album The Power of Rock and Roll.

The track "Heavy Metal Love", originally from No Rest for the Wicked, was re-recorded here due to a dispute with EMI.  The song was to be featured on the soundtrack for the Trailer Park Boys movie "The Big Dirty", however the track was pulled by Dean Cameron, president of EMI Canada.  The reason given was that distribution of the soundtrack was being handled by Universal, and not EMI who owns the track.  The band instead chose to re-record it and include it on Get Up!

Get Up! itself was hyped by Vollmer as "...very reminiscent of the No Rest For The Wicked album," after the alternative rock stylings of their previous studio album, Rockin' in My Outer Space, from 2004.

Track listing 
 Get Up!
 Boomerang Lover
 Cyberspace Girl
 Baby Likes To Ride
 The Past Is Back (To Kick Your Ass)
 Heavy Metal Love
 Do You Believe In Rock And Roll?

All songs written by Gord Prior, Steve Georgakopoulos and Brian Vollmer except "Heavy Metal Love" by Paul Hackman and Brian Vollmer.

Credits
Produced by Gord Prior
Mixed and mastered Dan Brodbeck and Aaron Murray
Engineered by Rainer Wiechmann

Recorded at Mole Studios, London, Ontario except "Heavy Metal Love" recorded at EMAC Recording Studios, London, Ontario.

Helix live band members
 Brian Vollmer - lead vocals
 Rick VanDyk - lead guitar
 Jim Lawson - lead guitar
 Brent "Ned" Niemi - drums
 Paul Fonseca - bass guitar

CD Musicians
 Brian Vollmer - vocals
 Steve Georgakopoulos - guitar, background vocals
 Rob MacEachern - drums
 Jeff Fountain - bass, background vocals
 Barry Donaghy, Gord Prior, Doug Weir, Dan Brodbeck  - background vocals

References

Helix (band) albums
2006 EPs